Ulrich "Ueli" Maurer (born 1 December 1950) is a Swiss politician who served as a Member of the Swiss Federal Council from 2009 to 2022. A member of the Swiss People's Party (SVP/UDC), he was President of the Swiss Confederation in 2013 and 2019. Formerly head of the Federal Department of Defence, Civil Protection and Sports (2009–2015), Maurer has headed the Federal Department of Finance from 2016 to 2022. Until 2022, he has been the longest-serving current member of the Federal Council since Doris Leuthard's resignation in 2018.

An accountant by occupation, Maurer chaired the Swiss People's Party from 1996 to 2008. Elected by the Swiss Federal Assembly to succeed Federal Councillor Samuel Schmid in 2008, he took office on 1 January 2009. Maurer served as Vice President of Switzerland for 2012 and 2018 and President of Switzerland for 2013 and 2019. He was reelected to the Federal Council in 2011, 2015 (when his party gained one seat) and 2019 (an election which saw all members of the Federal Council reelected).

Personal background and professional career
Maurer grew up as the son of a poor farmer in the Zürcher Oberland. After a commercial apprenticeship, Maurer received a federal accountant's diploma. He was director of the Zürich Farmers' Association from 1994 to 2008 and president of the Swiss Vegetable Farmers' Association and the Farmers' Machinery Association (Maschinenring) until his election to the Federal Council.

Maurer is married and has six children and currently resides in Hinwil in the canton of Zürich. He served in the Swiss Army with the rank of major, commanding a bicycle infantry battalion.

Political career

Cantonal politics
From 1978 to 1986, Maurer was a member of the municipal government of Hinwil. He was elected to the cantonal parliament of Zürich in 1983, which he presided over in 1991. In that year, he lost an election to the cantonal government against Moritz Leuenberger, as his opponents derided Maurer's campaign as inept and himself as a naïve devotee of party strongman Christoph Blocher. In the same year's national election, though, Maurer was elected to the National Council.

National career and party leadership
In 1996, at Blocher's behest, Maurer was elected to the presidency of the Swiss People's Party. Not taken seriously at first and parodied by TV comedian Viktor Giacobbo as Blocher's servile sycophant so memorably that his taunted children regularly returned from school in tears, his presidency saw the party double its voter base, establish itself in the French-speaking part of Switzerland and become the country's strongest political party. These successes have been largely credited to Maurer's leadership, who was able to make up a lack of charisma with astonishingly hard work, the imposition of strict party discipline, a keen sense for promising populist issues (such as opposition to European integration, foreigners and political correctness) as well as a penchant for headline-grabbing soundbites, as attested by an often-cited statement of his: "As long as I talk of negroes, the camera stays on me".

As president of the People's Party, Maurer was a leading force behind the party's aggressive and successful populist campaigns – campaigns that drew the ire of the Swiss political mainstream and the concern of foreign observers – signing off on cartoonish posters attacking leftists, foreigners and other undesirables. In a breach with Swiss political etiquette, he did not shy away from direct personal attacks on fellow politicians, labeling the center-right Free Democrats as "softies", Social Democratic voters as deranged, and renegade Federal Councillors Schmid and Eveline Widmer-Schlumpf as "appendices" requiring excision. Nonetheless, Maurer was able to keep his public persona separate from the way his colleagues in Parliament perceived him. In the National Council, his personal stature grew during his service and even political opponents credited his personal integrity, collegial demeanour and solid grasp of political issues. His good professional relations with Social Democratic women representatives were particularly noted by puzzled political observers.

Even as his and his party's star rose, however, relations between Maurer and his longtime mentor Blocher slowly cooled, even though the two men remained strong allies in public. Blocher, used to exercising authoritarian leadership as the party's undisputed leading figure, did not approve of Maurer questioning some of his strategic approaches, and increasingly exercised power through a close-knit circle of followers instead of through Maurer and the party secretariat. In October 2007, after the People's Party won its greatest electoral victory to date, Maurer resigned as party president and was succeeded against his wishes by Toni Brunner, one of Blocher's close confidants, on 1 March 2008. After losing a runoff election for a Council of States seat against Verena Diener, Maurer contented himself with the presidency of the Zürich section of the People's Party.

Swiss Federal Council

On 27 November 2008, the party's parliamentary group unanimously nominated both Maurer and Blocher as candidates to succeed Schmid as Federal Councillor. With Blocher – who was ousted from the Federal Council in 2007 – considered unelectable by all other parties, the Neue Zürcher Zeitung and other Swiss media called Maurer the clear frontrunner for the Council seat even before his nomination. On 10 December 2008 Maurer was elected to the Federal Council in the third round of voting with 122 votes, a margin of a single vote.

Maurer was elected Vice President of Switzerland for 2012, alongside President Eveline Widmer-Schlumpf. On 5 December 2012 he was elected President of the Swiss Confederation for 2013.

Maurer was reelected as Federal Councillor on 8 December 2015; on 11 December 2015 he was selected to become head of the Federal Department of Finance, with newly-elected Federal Councillor Guy Parmelin, a fellow member of the SVP/UDC, replacing him as head of the Federal Department of Defence, Civil Protection and Sports. As Switzerland's Finance Minister, Maurer attended the 2017 G20 Hamburg summit, becoming the first Federal Councillor to attend a G20 summit.

Maurer became President of the Swiss Confederation for a second time for 2019 after serving as vice president under Alain Berset in 2018. On 29 April 2019, during his visit in China, Maurer signed a Memorandum of Understanding under the Belt and Road Initiative. On 16 May 2019, Maurer met President Donald Trump in the White House, becoming the first Swiss President to meet a United States President in that location. The two discussed several issues, including Iran and a potential free trade agreement.

On 20 September 2022 Maurer announced his resignation, effective 31 December.

References

External links

|-

|-

|-

|-

|-

|-

1950 births
Living people
Members of the National Council (Switzerland)
Finance ministers of Switzerland
Members of the Federal Council (Switzerland)
People from Wetzikon
Swiss military officers
Swiss People's Party politicians
Swiss Protestants